Marysville High School is a public school located in Marysville, California, USA within the Yuba City Metropolitan Statistical Area. The school mascot is the Indians and the school colors are orange and black. As of June 2008, it has had 136 graduating classes.

References

High schools in Yuba County, California
Marysville, California
Public high schools in California
1871 establishments in California